Natshin Medaw (or) was crown princess of Toungoo Dynasty of Burma (Myanmar) from 1581 to 1586.

Early life
The princess the only child of Viceroy Thado Minsaw of Ava and Queen Inwa Mibaya in 1556. Their parents were closely related to each other: half-uncle and half-niece. She grew up in Ava (Inwa). She later moved to Pegu (Bago) when she was married to Mingyi Swa, her maternal first cousin, and her paternal half-cousin, once removed.

Crown princess
By chronicle accounts, the marriage was an unhappy one for both. It contributed to the fallout between her powerful parents and the high king Nanda that ultimately resulted in Ava's revolt in 1583–1584. In early 1583, Natshin Medaw sent a package to her parents, which contained a blood stained shawl and a letter. In the letter, she complained that her husband spent much of the time pursuing Princess Yaza Datu Kalaya, and that when she confronted him about the matter, he pushed her to the bedpost. The blood on the shawl, she explained, came from the cut on her forehead she received when she hit the bedpost.

The rebellion was put down in April 1584. The charade continued. Though she nominally remained the crown princess, Swa continued to pursue Yaza Data Kalaya, who was technically half-aunt to both Swa and Natshin Medaw. Yaza Datu Kalaya for her part continued to spurn her half-nephew's advances. But in October 1586, her protector Nanda went on a military campaign to Siam, and Swa remained in charge. Soon after, Swa raised her to be his queen, and in the process divorced Natshin Medaw. Back from Siam, the king was extremely unhappy to learn the news, and put Natshin Medaw in the same house as her mother with attendants.

Later life
The princess lived with her mother for the next seven years until her death in January 1595. After Pegu fell in December 1599, Natshin Medaw, along with other Pegu royalty, was taken to Toungoo (Taungoo). She spent ten years in Toungoo. On , King Anaukpetlun ordered that Min Taya Medaw, Min Htwe, and Natshin Medaw be sent to Ava (Inwa) with the full royal regalia befitting their former status.

References

Bibliography
 
 
 

First Toungoo Empire
1556 births
Year of death unknown